Prospect is a monthly British general-interest magazine, specialising in politics, economics and current affairs. Topics covered include British and other European, and US politics, social issues, art, literature, cinema, science, the media, history, philosophy and psychology. Prospect features a mixture of lengthy analytic articles, first-person reportage, one-page columns and shorter items.

The magazine was launched in October 1995 by David Goodhart, then a senior correspondent for the Financial Times (FT), and chairman Derek Coombs. Goodhart came up with the idea of producing an essay-based monthly general-interest magazine—a form at that time unknown in Britain—while covering German reunification as Bonn correspondent for the FT.

Some prominent intellectuals have featured in Prospect, including economists Joseph Stiglitz, Amartya Sen and Angus Deaton, writers such as Lionel Shriver, Clive James, Toni Morrison and Margaret Atwood, as well as scientists like Martin Rees. Notable features of the magazine include head-to-head debates between two writers with opposing views on a subject; roundtable discussions, in which a series of experts with varying views on a given topic meet for a discussion, an edited transcript of which is published in the magazine; and interviews with political and cultural figures (examples include Orhan Pamuk, Paul Wolfowitz and Hilary Mantel).

Prospect received worldwide attention in October 2005 when it published its list of the world's top 100 public intellectuals, which included Ziauddin Sardar, Noam Chomsky, Umberto Eco, Richard Dawkins, Steven Pinker and Christopher Hitchens. The magazine asked readers to vote for their top intellectual from the longlist; Chomsky was the eventual winner. Subsequent lists have continued to attract attention. Dawkins claimed the top spot in 2013. Amartya Sen won in 2014 and Thomas Piketty was the winner in 2015. After a four-year hiatus, the award was revived in 2019—the winner was the Kurdish mathematician Caucher Birkar.

Prospect has also published the winning short story of the Royal Society of Literature's V. S. Pritchett Memorial Prize since 2009.

Policy positions 
The magazine features contributions from authors spanning the political spectrum. It tends to avoid a "line" on specific policy issues, claiming to offer a "contrarian" view and to be an "open minded" magazine. It has published articles debunking the "popular wisdom", on topics ranging from Japan's alleged economic crisis to the Mahdi army in Iraq. However, it has been described as left-leaning by the BBC, and the Prospect contributor Roger Scruton.

In an August 2009 roundtable interview in Prospect, Adair Turner supported the idea of new global taxes on financial transactions, warning that a "swollen" financial sector paying excessive salaries has grown too big for society. Turner's suggestion that a "Tobin tax", named after the economist James Tobin, should be considered for financial transactions drew international attention.

Since 2004, the magazine's founding editor, David Goodhart, has stirred controversy with a series of articles arguing that the increasing diversity of the United Kingdom may weaken the bonds of solidarity on which the welfare state depends. The debate fed into the broader discussions of "Britishness".

Think Tank Awards 
Prospect holds the annual Think Tank Awards, which celebrate and reward the work of think tanks on a national and global scale. The awards are supported by Shell. Categories include "Global Think Tank of the Year", "Publication of the Year", "North American Think Tank of the Year", "European Think Tank of the Year" (excluding Britain), 'UK Think Tank of the Year', and many sub-categories for the UK.

According to the official website, "The awards are judged by a cross-party panel looking for evidence of influence on public policy and on the public discourse. The judges will also consider the quality of research and potential of younger and smaller organisations." The awards have been running since 2001, and have been expanding exponentially to include more global awards for international Think Tanks. The winner of the most recent 2017 Think Tank awards (held at the Institute of Directors on 10 July) was the Joseph Rowntree Foundation, based in the UK, for its "very strong analytical appraisal of social conditions in Britain".

List of editors

David Goodhart (1995–2011)
Bronwen Maddox (2011–2016)
Tom Clark (2016–2021)
Alan Rusbridger (2021–)

References

Further reading
David Goodhart (editor), Thinking Allowed: The Best of Prospect, 1995–2005, Atlantic Books, 2005.

External links

Official home page
Think Tank Awards official site
Think Tank Awards Previous Winners
Digital Edition

1995 establishments in the United Kingdom
News magazines published in the United Kingdom
Monthly magazines published in the United Kingdom
Magazines published in London
Magazines established in 1995
Political magazines published in the United Kingdom